Hartmann & Weiss GmbH (H&W) is a Hamburg-based custom sporting firearms maker founded in 1965. They make sporting arms, including shotguns, over and under, falling-block single rifles, and bolt-action rifles based on Mauser 98 and several other modern actions. They have produced small numbers of double rifles, in calibers from .375 H&H to the .600 Nitro Express.

History
Otto Weiss was a gunsmith who worked at Merkel in East Germany before fleeing that country in 1958 for England, where he initially worked at Purdey's.  Five years later he relocated to Hamburg to work with Gerhard Hartmann as a custom gunsmith.  In 1964 he and Hartmann founded the company.  Three years later, an associate named Peter Nelson established a second location in England.

References

External links
Official site

Firearm manufacturers of Germany